Malaysia sent athletes to the 2016 Summer Paralympics in Rio de Janeiro, Brazil, from 7 September to 18 September 2016. The country qualified athletes in archery, cycling, sailing, wheelchair tennis, athletics and swimming. Dr Ang Kean Koo was the chef de mission of the Malaysian delegation.

Malaysia won its first three gold medals in Paralympics history through the sport of athletics, which are contributed by sprinter Mohamad Ridzuan Mohamad Puzi, shot putter Muhammad Ziyad Zolkefli and long jumper Abdul Latif Romly who was also the flag bearer at the opening ceremony.

Funding 
The National Sports Council in Malaysia identified 61 Paralympic qualifying events in 13 sports for the 2016 Summer Paralympics and provided them with funding assistance to athletes to compete in them as part of their qualifying campaigns.  They also provided local training for athletes.

Medallists
The following Malaysian competitors won medals at the Games.

| width="95%" align="left" valign="top" |

| width="22%" align="left" valign="top" |

Archery 

Archery was one of the sports where competitors benefited from the funding of the National Sports Council in Malaysia to try to qualify for the 2016 Games.

Men's

Athletics 

Men's track events

 Mohamad Faizal Aideal Suhaimi was originally qualified for T12 event but later recategorised to T13 event.

Men's field events

Women's track events

Women's field events

Legend: DSQ =Disqualified Fn =False Start IPC 17.8 =Disqualified by rule IPC 17.8 PB =Personal Best PR =Paralympic Record RR =Regional Record SB =Seasonal Best WR =World Record

Cycling 

With one pathway for qualification being one highest ranked NPCs on the UCI Para-Cycling male and female Nations Ranking Lists on 31 December 2014, Malaysia qualified for the 2016 Summer Paralympics in Rio, assuming they continued to meet all other eligibility requirements.

Men's track cycling event

Legend: DNS =Did not start PR =Paralympic Record WR =World Record

Men's road event

Powerlifting

Sailing 

One pathway for qualifying for Rio involved having a boat have top seven finish at the 2015 Combined World Championships in a medal event where the country had not already qualified through via the 2014 IFDS Sailing World Championships.  Malaysia qualified for the 2016 Games under this criteria in the SKUD 18 event with a sixteenth-place finish overall and the seventh country who had not qualified via the 2014 Championships.  The boat was crewed by Nurul Amilin Balawi and Junell Mustafah.

DNF = Did not finish

Swimming

Table Tennis 

Men's individual

Wheelchair tennis 
Malaysia qualified one competitor in the men's single event, Abu Samah Borhan. This slot came about via a Bipartite Commission Invitation place.

See also
Malaysia at the 2016 Summer Olympics

References

Nations at the 2016 Summer Paralympics
2016
2016 in Malaysian sport